Ioannis Kambadelis (7 November 1927 – 1989) was a Greek hurdler. He competed in the men's 110 metres hurdles and the men's 400 metres hurdles at the 1956 Summer Olympics. He also competed in the men's 4 x 100 metres relay and the men's 4 x 400 relay at the 1952 Summer Olympics.

References

External links
 

1927 births
1989 deaths
Athletes (track and field) at the 1956 Summer Olympics
Greek male hurdlers
Olympic athletes of Greece
Place of birth missing
20th-century Greek people